The 1983 Roger Gallet Cup was a men's tennis tournament played on outdoor clay courts in Florence, Italy that was part of the 1983 Volvo Grand Prix circuit. It was the 11th edition of the tournament and was played from 9 May until 15 May 1983. Second-seeded Jimmy Arias won the singles title.

Finals

Singles
 Jimmy Arias defeated  Francesco Cancellotti 6–4, 6–3
 It was Arias' 1st singles title of the year and the 2nd of his career.

Doubles
 Francisco González /  Víctor Pecci defeated  Dominique Bedel /  Bernard Fritz 4–6, 6–4, 7–6

References

External links
 ITF tournament edition details

Alitalia Florence Open
Alitalia Florence Open
Tennis tournaments in Italy